The following are the national records in Olympic weightlifting in Lithuania. Records are maintained in each weight class for the snatch lift, clean and jerk lift, and the total for both lifts by the Weightlifting Federation of Lithuania (Lietuvos sunkiosios atletikos federacija).

Current records
Key to tables:

Men

Women

Historical records

Men (1998–2018)

Women (1998–2018)

See also
 List of Lithuanian records

References
General
Lithuanian records – Men 11 December 2022 updated
Lithuanian records – Women 13 December 2022 updated
Specific

External links
Lithuanian weightlifting federation

Records
Lithuania
Weightlifting
Olympic weightlifting